Sofija Efimovna Jakimovič (Kildin Sámi: Софья Ефимовна Якимович; 23 March 1940 – 15 June 2006), also known as Efim Sofia, was a Kildin Sámi-language folklorist, poet, storyteller, composer, and translator.

Early life
She was born in Lovozero, Murmansk, on the Kola Peninsula in Russia (then the Soviet Union). After school, Jakimovič worked as a laborer, helping to construct a railway from Oktyabrsky to Revda, and then as a concrete worker, earthmover, and bricklayer for the Lovozerstroy construction firm.

Folklorist and author
After retiring, Jakimovič turned her attention to writing drawing upon family tales, songs, and folklore of her Sámi ancestors. In 1992, she organized the Sámi folklore group Чуззем (Čuzz'em), which performed in Estonia, Finland, and Norway.

In 1999, the Norwegian company Davvi Girji OS published Jakimovič's bilingual fairy tale Мо̄джесь На̄ст / Čáppa Násttáš (Beautiful Násttáš) in Kildin Sámi and Northern Sámi about a girl who falls in love with a fisherman. The same year a collection of her poems, Праздник медведя (Feast of the Bear), was published in a translation by the Russian poet Vikdan Sinitsyn. In 2015, Са̄мь мо̄а̄ййнас / Саамские сказки (Sámi Tales), a collection of her folktales, was published in Kilden Sámi and Russian.

References

External links
 Праздник медведя (Feast of the Bear) poetry collection in Russian

1940 births
2006 deaths
People from Lovozersky District
Sámi-language poets
Russian women poets
20th-century Russian poets
20th-century Russian women writers